Benny Ben Zaken (born 18 October 1982) is a retired Israeli footballer and currently manager.

Honours
Israeli Premier League
Winner (1): 2011–12

References

1982 births
Living people
Israeli footballers
Footballers from Kiryat Shmona
Hapoel Ironi Kiryat Shmona F.C. players
Hapoel Asi Gilboa F.C. players
Liga Leumit players
Israeli Premier League players
Israeli football managers
Hapoel Ironi Kiryat Shmona F.C. managers
Hapoel Katamon Jerusalem F.C. managers
Hapoel Afula F.C. managers
Beitar Jerusalem F.C. managers
Bnei Sakhnin F.C. managers
Hapoel Ramat Gan F.C. managers
Israeli Premier League managers
Israeli people of Moroccan-Jewish descent
Association football midfielders